= Trick skiing =

Trick skiing is a type of skiing where stunts are performed on skis. It may refer to:

- Freestyle skiing, when the tricks are performed on snow
- Waterskiing, when the tricks are performed on water
